Jeungtongguksa was a Korean Royal Prince as the fifth and youngest son of Taejo of Goryeo and Queen Sinmyeong, also a Korean Buddhist monk and was the one who rebuilt Jinpyoyul Temple (진표율사). Later, during the Joseon dynasty periods, the temple was repaired by the King Sejo of Joseon. In the old days, there were about thousands of monks lived in there.

See also
Wang Seokgi
Uicheon

References

Korean princes
Year of birth unknown
Year of death unknown
Goryeo Buddhist monks